Hendijan County is in Khuzestan province, Iran. The capital of the county is the city of Hendijan. At the 2006 census, the county's population was 35,932 in 7,227 households. The following census in 2011 counted 37,440 people in 8,873 households. At the 2016 census, the county's population was 38,762 in 10,636 households. Hendijan County is located in the southeast of Iran and is connected to Persian Gulf through Zohreh River.

Administrative divisions

The population history of Hendijan County's administrative divisions over three consecutive censuses is shown in the following table. The latest census shows two districts, four rural districts, and two cities.

History
The name of this area was "Hendigan" after Islam entered Iran, because of its vicinity to Persian Gulf.

According to archaeological documents, this area was a residential area on the edge of Hendijan river around 10,000 years BCE.

Some earthen wares also prove civilization in lower part of Hendijan river in the vicinity of Persian Gulf related to Arsacid Empire era.

Some earthen wares famous as Chinese earthen ware has been found in the historical harbor called “Mahi Rouban” in the vicinity of Hendijan related to Ashkaniyan era.

References

 

Counties of Khuzestan Province